Jhilli Dalabehera (born 3 February 1999) is an Indian weightlifter.
In 2021 she competed at the 2020 Asian Weightlifting Championships held in Tashkent in the 45 kg category. She swept gold medals in all lifts.
In 2019 she had won silver medal at 2019 Asian Weightlifting Championships. She won Gold medal in South Asian game 2019 in women's 45 kg weight category.

She competed in the women's 49 kg event at the 2021 World Weightlifting Championships held in Tashkent, Uzbekistan. The 2021 Commonwealth Weightlifting Championships were also held at the same time and her total result gave her the silver medal in this event.

References

External links

1999 births
Living people
Indian female weightlifters
Weightlifters from Odisha
Sportswomen from Odisha
20th-century Indian women
21st-century Indian women